There were 34 shooting events at the 2010 South American Games. Competitions were held over March 20–26.

Medal summary

Medal table

Men

Women

References

 
Shooting
South American Games
2010 South American Games
Shooting competitions in Colombia